Allsvenskan (also known as Fotbollsallsvenskan) is a Swedish professional league for men's association football clubs. It was founded in 1924 and is the top tier of the Swedish football league system, operating on a system of promotion and relegation with Superettan. Seasons run from late March or early April to the beginning of November, with the 16 clubs all meeting each other twice, resulting in a 30-match season, for a total of 240 matches league-wide.

Allsvenskan is ranked 23rd in the UEFA coefficients of leagues based on performances in European competitions over the last five years. Allsvenskan is currently ranked third highest of the leagues in Scandinavia after Norway and Denmark. The current champions are BK Häcken, who won the title in the 2022 season.

"The Big Three" in Swedish football and Allsvenskan is used to refer to AIK, IFK Göteborg, and Malmö FF. They are generally considered to be the three largest clubs in Sweden from the three largest cities (Stockholm, Gothenburg, and Malmö). The three teams with most Swedish championships are Malmö FF (22), IFK Göteborg (18) and IFK Norrköping (13).

. Unlike other European football leagues, the Allsvenskan did not experience an interruption in play during World War II due to Swedish neutrality.

History

Allsvenskan started in the 1924–25 Allsvenskan season and the first winner was GAIS. The one-league twelve team Allsvenskan replaced the Svenska Serien, consisting of a southern and northern group that was held before. In 1931, the league started to decide the Swedish football champions.

In the early years, Norrland and Gotland teams were not allowed to play on higher levels in the league system, which was gradually changed to include the Norrland and Gotland teams on higher levels.

For the 1959 Allsvenskan, the season start was changed from autumn to spring to be played in one calendar year. In 1973, it was expanded to contain 14 teams. In the 1970s, Malmö FF, under the lead of Spanish Antonio Durán and later English Bob Houghton, won five Allsvenskan and managed to proceed to the 1979 European Cup Final, which they lost to Nottingham Forest.

From the 1982 season, the league introduced a play-off to determine the Swedish football champions. In the late 1980s, Malmö FF were dominant, winning the league five times in a row, but only two Swedish championships. The 1990 season saw the introduction of three points per win. The play-off season years were followed by two years of continuation league, named Mästerskapsserien.

The 1993 season saw a return to the classical format, again with 14 teams. IFK Göteborg won five Allsvenskan league titles in the 1990s.

In the early 2000s, Djurgårdens IF won three titles (2002, 2003 and 2005). In 2004, Örebro SK lost its place in the league due to financial problems, and Assyriska FF got their place. Since 2008, the league consists of 16 teams.

Status 

The champions are considered Swedish champions and gold medal winners. The runners-up are awarded the Large Silver medal, the third positioned team are awarded the Small Silver medal and the team positioned in fourth place are awarded the Bronze medal.

There have been seasons with exceptions when the winners of Allsvenskan wasn't considered Swedish champions as well. Allsvenskan winners between 1924 and 1930 were crowned league champions and awarded gold medals, the title of Swedish champions was awarded to the winner of Svenska Mästerskapet up until 1925 and then not at all until 1930. The years 1982 through 1990 are also exceptions, the title was instead decided through play-offs during these years. The same was true for the years 1991 and 1992 when the title was decided through a continuation league called Mästerskapsserien. 
Historically, however, there is a big difference between the Allsvenskan winners before 1931 compared to the period between 1982 and 1992. As winning Allsvenskan in its earlier seasons was the optimal aim for the clubs, while as during the era of play-offs and Mästerskapsserien, the optimal goal wasn't to win Allsvenskan, but the play-offs or Mästerskapsserien.

Competition format 
Since 2008 there are 16 clubs in Allsvenskan. During the course of a season (starting in late March and ending in early November) each club plays the others twice (home and away) for a total of 30 games. The two lowest placed teams at the end of the season are relegated to Superettan and the top two teams from Superettan are promoted in their place. The third lowest team in Allsvenskan plays a relegation/promotion play-off against the third placed team in Superettan.

The winners of Allsvenskan qualify for the UEFA Champions League, the runner-up together with the third placed team in the table qualify for the UEFA Europa League as well as the team who wins the Svenska Cupen. In case the winner of the Cup has already qualified to Champions League or Europa League, the third Europa League spot is given to the team that finishes fourth in Allsvenskan.

Changes in competition format

The decider at equal number of points was goal ratio until the 1940–41 season, thereafter goal difference.

Awards

Trophy
The current trophy awarded to the Swedish champions is the Lennart Johanssons Pokal. Created in 2001, the trophy is named after former UEFA chairman, Lennart Johansson. A different trophy that was named after Clarence von Rosen, the first chairman of the Swedish Football Association, had previously been used between 1903 and 2000, but was replaced after journalists reported that von Rosen had personal connections to the later infamous Nazi leader Hermann Göring during the time he lived in Sweden (soon after World War One). The former President of the Swedish Football Association, Lars-Åke Lagrell stated that the reason for the change of trophy was not a personal attack against Von Rosen but rather that the Football Association did not want to be linked to Nazism and constantly engage in discussions regarding this every time the trophy was awarded.

Player and manager awards
In addition to the winner's trophy and the individual winner's medals awarded to players, Allsvenskan also awards the most valuable player, goalkeeper of the year, defender of the year, midfielder of the year, forward of the year, newcomer of the year and manager of year at Allsvenskans stora pris together with C More and Magasinet Offside. Also, the Allsvenskan top scorer is awarded.

Television

Sweden 
The Swiss corporation Kentaro has owned the TV rights for Allsvenskan since 2006. Through licence agreements with the media company TV4 Group matches are aired through C More Entertainment who broadcasts them on their C More Sport and C More Live channels, until 2019. Matches can also be bought through the online pay-per-view service C SPORTS.

On March 24, 2017, Discovery-owned channel Eurosport and OTT streaming service dPlay will be the new domestic broadcaster for both SEF competitions (Allsvenskan and Superettan) effectively from 2020 until 2025, as well as selected European countries (exc. Italy) for Allsvenskan.

International 

Beginning in 2018, Allsvenskan matches were previously broadcast in the UK on Premier Sports and FreeSports. In October 2018, ESPN picked up the rights to broadcast one Allsvenskan match per week in the United States. Allsvenskan matches have also been broadcast in several countries, such as DAZN in Austria, Germany, and Switzerland, Sport Klub in Balkan countries, Nova sports in Cyprus and Greece, TV2 in Norway and 4th Sports in Iraq

Current broadcast rights

Clubs 

A total of 67 clubs have played in Allsvenskan from its inception in 1924 up to and including the 2023 season. No club has been a member of the league for every season since its inception. AIK is the club that has participated in the most seasons, with a record of 92 out of 97 seasons in total. Malmö FF has the record for most consecutive seasons: 63 between 1936–37 and 1999. IFK Göteborg is currently the club with the longest running streak, starting their 47th season in 2023.

The following 16 clubs are competing in Allsvenskan during the 2022 season:

Stadiums and locations 

Current team and stadiums:

Managers
The current managers in Allsvenskan are:

Players

Appearances
Sven Andersson has the record for most appearances in Allsvenskan with 431 appearances for Örgryte IS and Helsingborgs IF. Sven Jonasson has the record for most matches in a row with 332 matches for IF Elfsborg between 11 September 1927 and 1 November 1942.

Foreign players

Until 1974, foreign players were banned from playing in Allsvenskan, however not on all levels of football in Sweden. In the first season of allowance, on 13 April 1974, English Ronald Powell in Brynäs IF became the first foreign player in Allsvenskan In 1977, Tunisian Melke Amri became the first non-European player. In 1978, Icelandic Teitur Þórðarson in Östers IF became the first foreign player to win the Allsvenskan

Top scorers
Sven Jonasson has scored the most goals in Allsvenskan history, with 254 goals in 410 appearances. Gunnar Nordahl has become the top scorer most times, with four wins.

Previous winners 

Key

Performances

Medal table
Historically the players and coaching staff from the four best teams in Allsvenskan are awarded medals at the end of each season. The champions are awarded the gold medal while the runners-up receive the "big silver" medal. The third place team gets the "small silver" medal instead of the more commonly used bronze medal which is instead awarded to the fourth-place finisher. This tradition of awarding four medals and not three is thought to have to do with the fact that the losers of the Semi-finals of Svenska Mästerskapet were both given bronze medals since no bronze match was played.

The overall medal rank is displayed below after points in descending order. 5 points are awarded for a "gold" medal, 3 points for a "big silver" medal, 2 points for a "small silver" medal and 1 point for a bronze medal. The table that follows is accurate as of the end of the 2020 season.

Honoured clubs
Clubs in European football are commonly honoured for winning multiple league titles and a representative golden star is sometimes placed above the club badge to indicate the club having won 10 league titles. In Sweden the star instead symbolizes 10 Swedish championship titles for the majority of the clubs as the league winner has not always been awarded the title of Swedish champions. Stars for Allsvenskan clubs was not common practise until 2006, although AIK had already introduced a star to their kit in 2000. IFK Göteborg, Malmö FF, IFK Norrköping, Örgryte IS and Djurgårdens IF were the first teams after AIK to introduce their stars. No new club has introduced a star since 2006, the clubs closest to their first are IF Elfsborg with 6 Swedish championship titles and Helsingborgs IF with 7 Allsvenskan titles depending on what the star symbolizes. The following table is ordered after number of stars followed by number of Swedish championship titles and then the number of Allsvenskan titles.

Statistics updated as of the end of the 2021 season

Cities

All-time Allsvenskan table
The all-time Allsvenskan table, "maratontabellen" in Swedish, is a cumulative record of all match results, points, and goals of every team that has played in Allsvenskan since its inception in 1924–25. It uses three points for a win even though this system was not introduced until the 1990 season. The matches played in the championship play-offs between 1982 and 1990 or the matches played in Mästerskapsserien in 1991 and 1992 are not included. The table that follows is accurate as of the end of the 2022 season.

Malmö FF are the current leaders, having had the lead since the end of the 2012 season when they overtook the lead from IFK Göteborg. IFK Göteborg are the club to have spent most seasons in the top spot with 48 seasons as leaders with a record of the most consecutive seasons as leaders with 35 seasons between 1938 and 1972. Six clubs have been in the lead, the lead having changed among them ten times since 1925. The former leader with the lowest current ranking in the table is GAIS, currently placing 12th and 2010 points short of Malmö FF.

A total of 67 clubs have played at least one season at Allsvenskan up to and including 2022 season.

Statistics

UEFA coefficients

The following data indicates Swedish coefficient rankings between European football leagues.

Country ranking
UEFA League Ranking as of 19 May 2022:
 20.  (13)  Süper Lig (27.100)
 21.  (15)  Cypriot First Division (26.375)
 22.  (21)  Israeli Premier League (24.375)
 23.  (23)  Allsvenskan (20.500)
 24.  (24)  First Professional Football League (20.375)
 25.  (25)  Liga I (18.200)

Club ranking
UEFA 5-year Club Ranking as of 19 May 2022:
 68.  (88) Malmö FF (23.500)
 130.  (128) Östersunds FK (10.000)
 254.  (187) AIK (5.000)
 266.  (273) Hammarby IF (4.575)

Attendance

The record for highest average home attendance for a club was set by Hammarby in 2022 (26,372 over 15 home matches). Most other attendance records for Allsvenskan were set in the 1959 season, coinciding with the first season that the league switched from an autumn–spring format to a spring–autumn format. 1959 saw records for highest attendance at a match (52,194 at an Örgryte win over IFK Göteborg at Ullevi), second highest average home attendance for a club (25,490 for Örgryte's 11 home matches), and the highest ever average attendance for Allsvenskan as a whole (13,369).

In the past, AIK had the league's highest attendance for the season more often than any other club, followed by IFK Göteborg and Örgryte. However, for the past two decades, Hammarby has dominated the attendance figures helped by a move to the larger Tele2 Arena from the much smaller Söderstadion. Other teams that have for at least one season had the best attendance in the league include Helsingborg, Malmö FF, Djurgården, GAIS, Örebro SK and Öster.

Referees

Allsvenskan has 23 active referees that are available for matches as of the 2020 season. Currently there are seven fully certified international FIFA referees in Allsvenskan. There are also a further twelve referees who are certified by the Swedish Football Association who have refereed matches in Allsvenskan. A further four referees certified by the Swedish Football Association are available to referee Allsvenskan matches but have not done so as of 2020.

FIFA certified referees
 Mohammed Al-Hakim
 Andreas Ekberg
 Kristoffer Karlsson
 Glenn Nyberg
 Bojan Pandžić
 Martin Strömbergsson
 Kaspar Sjöberg

Allsvenskan in international competition

Malmö FF were runners up in the 1978–79 European Cup, after a 1–0 defeat against Nottingham Forest.  IFK Göteborg won the UEFA Cup twice, in 1981–82 (defeating Hamburger SV in the finals) and 1986–87 (defeating Dundee United in the finals). IFK Göteborg also reached the semi-finals of the European Cup in 1985–86. They won 3–0 against FC Barcelona, and lost 0–3 at Camp Nou, Barcelona won on penalty shootout.

The following teams have participated in UEFA Champions League, UEFA Europa League or UEFA Europa Conference League group stages:

See also 
 Damallsvenskan
 List of Allsvenskan top scorers
 List of foreign Allsvenskan players
 Seasons in Swedish football
 Sports attendances

Footnotes

References

External links 

Official Allsvenskan website
Allsvenskan at the Swedish Football Association website

 
1
Sweden
Summer association football leagues
1924 establishments in Sweden
Swedish Professional Football Leagues
Sports leagues established in 1924
Professional sports leagues in Sweden